de Búrca (also de Burgh, Búrc and Burke, and Latinised as de Burgo) is an  Irish Anglo-Norman surname deriving from the ancient Anglo-Norman and Hiberno-Norman noble dynasty, the House of Burgh. In Ireland, the descendants of William de Burgh (c.1160–1206) had the surname de Burgh which was gaelicised in Irish as de Búrca and over the centuries became Búrc then Burke and Bourke.

Notable people with this name include:

Surname

A
 Aoife de Búrca (1885–1974), born Eva Burke, Red Cross nurse during the Irish Easter Rising

D
 David de Burca or David de Burgh, 15th Mac William Iochtar (alive 1537), Irish chieftain and noble
 Déirdre de Búrca (born 1963), Irish Green Party politician who served as a Senator in the Seanad Éireann (2007–2010)

E
 Edmond de Burca or Edmond de Burgh, 12th Mac William Iochtar (died 1527), Irish chieftain and noble
 Edmund na Féasóige de Burca or Edmund de Burgh, 4th Mac William Iochtar (died 1458), Irish chieftain and noble

G
 Gráinne de Búrca (born 1966), Irish legal scholar

M

 Máirín de Burca (born 1938), Irish writer, journalist and activist
 Méabh de Búrca (born 1988), Irish footballer
 Micheál de Búrca or Michael Bourke (1912–1985), Irish artist and Director of the National College of Art and Design, Ireland

N
 Nan Tom Teaimín de Búrca, Irish traditional sean-nós singer
 Niamh de Búrca, Irish traditional and folk singer

P

 Peadar de Burca, Irish actor, playwright and comedian

R
 Risdeárd de Burca or Ruchard de Burgh, 6th Mac William Íochtar (died 1473), Irish chieftain and noble

T
 Tadhg de Búrca or Tadhg Bourke (born 1994), Irish hurler 
 Tomás Óg de Burca or Tomás Óg de Burgh, 5th Mac William Iochtar (died 1460), Irish chieftain and noble
 Thomas mac Edmond Albanach de Burca or Thomas de Burgh, 2nd Mac William Iochtar (died 1402), Irish chieftain and noble

W
 Walter mac Thomas de Burca or Walter de Burgh, 3rd Mac William Iochtar (died 1440), Irish chieftain and noble

See also
 Burke (disambiguation)
 House of Burgh, an Anglo-Norman and Hiberno-Norman dynasty founded in 1193
 Clanricarde (Mac William Uachtar/Upper Mac William) or Galway (Upper Connaught) Burkes
 DeBerg, surname
 de Burgh-Canning
 Earl of Clanricarde, earldom in the Peerage of Ireland created in 1543 and 1800
 Lord of Connaught, title claimed in the Peerage of Ireland
 Earl of Ulster, earldom created in the Peerage of Ireland in 1264
 Bourke (disambiguation)
 Burgo (disambiguation)
 De Burghs Bridge, road bridge in Sydney, Australia

References

Irish-language surnames